Isabella Gibbons ( – February 4, 1890) was an enslaved woman serving as a cook at the University of Virginia, in Charlottesville, Virginia. After liberation in 1865 she became a teacher.

Under slavery
Isabella's birth date, place of birth, and parents are unknown. About 1850 she was purchased by William Barton Rogers, a professor of natural philosophy (science) at the University, and was his family's cook until 1853. She apparently was taught to read by Mrs. Rogers. In the early 1850s she married William Gibbons, also an enslaved laborer owned by a university professor. They had four children; one was named Bella.

In 1853 Rogers was replaced as professor of natural philosophy by Francis Henry Smith, and Gibbons was the cook for Smith's family until 1863.

She acted as nurse at the Confederate military hospital set up at the University.

After emancipation
She and her husband were freed when General Philip Sheridan's troops reached Charlottesville, bringing the Emancipation Proclamation with them, on March 3, 1865 (see Liberation and Freedom Day).
 
She became a teacher at the Freedmen's School; its direct descendant is the Jefferson School. Newspaper reports speak positively of her:

She received similar praise in 1867 and 1869. The last reference to her as a Charlottesville teacher is from 1874.

Memorial to Enslaved Laborers

The only known writing of Isabella is the following letter, published in the journal of the charity providing support to schools for freedmen, the New England Freedman's Aid Society. In all the several references to her in this publication her name appears as Gibbins.

The sentences with italic added were inscribed in the Memorial to Enslaved Laborers at the University of Virginia, in Charlottesville.

Her eyes, from the above photograph, were etched on the outside of the memorial.

Legacy
 In 2015, the University of Virginia named its new residence hall Gibbons House, in honor of Isabella and William. In the public area are photos of them, interpretive panels on the walls, and a plaque about them.
 Isabella's eyes, based on the above photograph, as there is no other, and the quote cited above, are inscribed on the exterior of the Memorial to Enslaved Laborers.

References

Further reading
 

1836 births
1890 deaths
19th-century American slaves
19th-century African-American women
African-American educators
People from Charlottesville, Virginia
People from Washington, D.C.
African-American history of Virginia
Enslaved workers at the University of Virginia